Gary C. Contessa (October 13, 1957 in Merrick, New York)  is an American horse trainer in the sport of Thoroughbred horse racing. He became a professional trainer in 1984.

From 2006 through 2008, Gary Contessa led all New York Racing Association (NYRA) trainers in wins. In 2007 he set a record with 159 NYRA wins. He was the New York Racing Association, Trainer of the Year in 2006 and 2007.

External link
 Gary Contessa Official Homepage
 Video at YouTube titled "A Day in the Life of Gary Contessa"

References

1957 births
Living people
American horse trainers
People from Merrick, New York